Masters of the Universe (stylized as Masters of the Universe: The Motion Picture) is a 1987 American superhero film directed by Gary Goddard, produced by Yoram Globus and by Menahem Golan and written by David Odell. The film stars Dolph Lundgren, Frank Langella, Jon Cypher, Chelsea Field, Billy Barty, Courteney Cox, Robert Duncan McNeill, and Meg Foster. It is based on the Mattel toy line of the same name and tells the story of two teenagers who meet He-Man, the most powerful man in the universe, and his friends, who arrive on Earth by chance from their home planet Eternia and go on a mission to save the universe from He-Man’s archenemy, the evil Skeletor.

Masters of the Universe was released theatrically in the United States on August 7, 1987. It was a critical and commercial failure, grossing $17 million worldwide against a budget of $22 million, but is now regarded as a classic cult film.

Plot
On the planet Eternia, Skeletor's army seizes Castle Grayskull, scatters the remaining Eternian defenders, and captures the Sorceress of Grayskull, planning to seize power over the entire universe by the next moonrise. Skeletor's archenemy, the warrior He-Man, veteran soldier Man-At-Arms and his daughter Teela rescue Gwildor from Skeletor's forces. Gwildor, a Thenorian locksmith, reveals that Skeletor has acquired his invention: a "Cosmic Key" that can open a portal to anywhere by utilizing musical notes. The device was stolen by Skeletor's second-in-command, Evil-Lyn, allowing Skeletor to breach Castle Grayskull.

With Gwildor's remaining prototype of the Key in hand, He-Man and his friends travel to the Castle. They attempt to free the Sorceress but are overwhelmed by Skeletor's army and forced to flee through Gwildor's hastily opened portal, transporting them to Earth. The Key is misplaced on their arrival and discovered by two California teenagers, orphaned high school girl Julie Winston and her boyfriend Kevin Corrigan. While experimenting with the device, they accidentally send a signal that allows Evil-Lyn to track it. She then sends her henchmen Saurod, Blade, Beast Man and Karg to recover it.

Kevin, an aspiring musician, mistakes the Key for a synthesizer and takes it to a music store run by his friend Charlie. Karg's team arrives and chases Julie until He-Man rescues her. Karg's team returns to Grayskull where, incensed by their failure, Skeletor kills Saurod and sends the others back to Earth, with a larger force under Evil-Lyn's command. Unable to find Julie, Kevin is taken to Julie's house by Lubic, a detective investigating the disturbance created by Karg's team. Suspecting the Key is stolen, Lubic confiscates it from Kevin and leaves. Immediately afterward, Evil-Lyn captures and interrogates Kevin for the Key's location with a mind-control collar, before pursuing Lubic.

Julie and the Eternians release Kevin from the collar before they go after Lubic and the Key. They arrive at Charlie's store, but Skeletor's forces catch up with them and a pitched battle ensues. Evil-Lyn recovers the Key and summons Skeletor to Earth. Skeletor's forces capture the Eternians, and Julie is mortally wounded by Skeletor's lightning blast, which simultaneously erases the memory storage of Gwildor's Key. He-Man surrenders to save his comrades and is returned to Eternia as Skeletor's slave. Skeletor attempts to torture He-Man into submission, to make his victory complete, but He-Man refuses to yield. The moment arrives for Skeletor to receive the power of the cosmos, and declaring himself the Master of the Universe, Skeletor uses his new powers to attempt to force He-Man to kneel.

Back on Earth, Gwildor repairs the Cosmic Key and Kevin re-creates the tones necessary to create a gateway to Eternia. The group, including Lubic who attempts to arrest them, are transported to Castle Grayskull, where they begin battling Skeletor's forces. Resenting that Skeletor absorbed the power of the Universe without sharing it with her, Evil-Lyn deserts him along with the other henchmen. Skeletor accidentally frees He-Man, who reclaims the Sword of Grayskull, and they battle until He-Man shatters Skeletor's staff, removing his new powers and restoring him to his normal state. He-Man offers mercy, but Skeletor draws a concealed sword and attempts to kill He-Man; He-Man knocks Skeletor into a vast pit below. The freed Sorceress heals Julie and a portal is opened to send the Earthlings home. Hailed as a hero for his bravery, Lubic decides to remain on Eternia.

Julie awakens on the morning of her parents' deaths by plane crash. She prevents them from taking the ill-fated flight by taking their keys, and runs outside to find Kevin. Kevin confirms that their experiences were real, producing a souvenir from Eternia: a small blue sphere containing a scene of He-Man in front of Castle Grayskull with his sword raised above his head.

In a post-credits scene, Skeletor's head emerges from the water at the bottom of the pit, saying "I'll be back!"

Cast

 Dolph Lundgren as He-Man
 Frank Langella as Skeletor
 Courteney Cox as Julie Winston
 Barry Livingston as Charlie
 James Tolkan as Detective Hugh Lubic
 Christina Pickles as Sorceress
 Meg Foster as Evil-Lyn
 Chelsea Field as Teela
 Jon Cypher as Man-At-Arms
 Billy Barty as Gwildor
 Robert Duncan McNeill as Kevin Corrigan
 Anthony De Longis as Blade
 Tony Carroll as Beast Man
 Pons Maar as Saurod
 Robert Towers as Karg
 Peter Brooks as Narrator
 Richard Szponder as Pigboy

Production

Development and writing
One of the original drafts from the script by David Odell (whose previous writing credits include Supergirl and The Dark Crystal) was reviewed in the third episode of the He-Man and She-Ra podcast, Masters Cast. The original draft included more time spent on Eternia and Snake Mountain, had Beast Man in a speaking role, and even revealed that He-Man's mother was originally from Earth, as per the character Queen Marlena from the Filmation animated series He-Man and the Masters of the Universe, thus linking the two planets. Describing her character, Foster said that Evil-Lyn is not villainous, "she is just doing her job and she knows how to get results, even if it means being harsh." Langella agreed, calling Evil-Lyn a female more dedicated to Skeletor's cause than any man; she is obsessive around Skeletor because she is slightly lovelorn. The filmmakers considered having Foster wear contact lenses to mask her naturally pale-blue eyes, but decided that her natural eyes fit the character better. However, they did augment Foster's chest, fitting cleavage into the character's costume. Foster wanted the character to have a large hairstyle, rather than the short style featured in the film.

When offered the role, Langella said that he "didn’t even blink…I couldn't wait to play him." Langella cited his then-four-year-old son's love of Skeletor while running around his house yelling He-Man's battle cry "I have the power!" as the reason he chose to play He-Man's archenemy.

Filming
According to director Gary Goddard, Mattel caused problems for the production crew for not paying their half of the production budget on time. A member of staff was forced to put lens caps on cameras during several days to prevent any more filming from taking place. Due to the production running out of budget, Goddard had to finance the filming of the battle scene between He-Man and Skeletor himself. Only Lundgren and Langella were present along with a skeleton crew with the set's lighting made dark to emphasize the actors' presence.

Mattel was also initially very controlling over how He-Man was depicted in the film, insisting that the character could not appear doing anything morally wrong (such as swearing or killing). Sales of He-Man toys dipped in the middle of production, after which Goddard noted that Mattel allowed the director to have more liberties with the character.

During filming, Mattel held a contest for children for a chance to appear in the film. Richard Szponder won the competition, but his victory was announced as filming was nearing completion. All the scenes taking place on Earth had been shot, so Goddard cast him as the minion character Pigboy who holds Skeletor's staff as he returns to Grayskull. 

Two sound stages needed to be connected to film the interior of Castle Grayskull, with matte paintings filling in the pits of the central walk-way. Goddard initially planned to have Lundgren's dialogue dubbed over by another actor but eventually Lundgren learned his lines well enough that he decided against it.

Jack Kirby inspiration
Comic book writer/artist John Byrne compared the film to Jack Kirby's comic book metaseries Fourth World, stating in Comic Shop News #497:

Director Gary Goddard clarified this in a letter appearing in John Byrne's Next Men #26, in which he stated:

Brian Cronin, author of the "Comic Book Urban Legends Revealed" column, concludes that "the film itself was not intended to be literally a reworked Fourth World, although the intent WAS to make the film a tribute to Jack Kirby—just a tribute to ALL of his work, not just the Fourth World."

Music

Soundtrack
The musical score of Masters of the Universe was composed by Bill Conti. It was recorded by several European orchestras, chiefly the Graunke Orchestra of Munich (the only one to be credited on the soundtrack album) and conducted by a number of conductors, chiefly Bruce Miller and Harry Rabinowitz (Rabinowitz received sole credit). Conti did not conduct his score because it could not be recorded in the United States as "there was a musicians strike or something like that…So it went to various places." He and the score mixer Dan Wallin assembled the score from the various recorded takes, because there were problems with the orchestral performances ("We didn't have anything that went from beginning to end without a problem").

The soundtrack album was released on record, cassette, and compact disc by Varèse Sarabande in 1987; it was subsequently issued in an expanded version by Edel. In 2008, La-La Land Records released a two-disc edition with the complete score and the original album presentation; in 2012, Intrada Records issued the complete score (the entirely of disc one and tracks 1–5 on disc two) on one disc.

Release

Home media
Masters of the Universe was released on DVD October 23, 2001. A 25th Anniversary Edition Blu-ray Disc was released by Warner Home Video on October 2, 2012.

Reception

Box office
Prior to releasing the film, The Cannon Group touted Masters of the Universe as the Star Wars of the 1980s. Despite releasing alongside the height of the success of the toy line, animated series, and related merchandise, Masters of the Universe began as the third-highest-grossing film of the weekend in North America on August 7, 1987, earning $4,883,168, behind Stakeout ($5,170,403) and The Living Daylights ($7,706,230). The film quickly left the charts altogether with a North American gross of $17,336,370.

The film was released in the Philippines by Solar Films on September 10, 1987.

Critical response
Masters of the Universe received generally negative reviews from critics and holds a 22% rating on Rotten Tomatoes based on 27 reviews. The critical consensus reads: "Masters of the Universe is a slapdash adaptation of the He-Man mythos that can't overcome its cynical lack of raison d'etre, no matter how admirably Frank Langella throws himself into the role of Skeletor." On Metacritic the film has a weighted average score of 35 out of 100, based on 9 critics, indicating "generally unfavorable reviews". Variety called it a "Conan-Star Wars hybrid ripoff" that is "a colossal bore." Walter Goodman of The New York Times wrote, "If you liked the toy, you'll love the movie." Michael Wilmington of the Los Angeles Times called it "a misfiring, underdone epic." Johanna Steinmetz of the Chicago Tribune wrote that the film, while predictable and derivative, entertains audiences through its side plots set on Earth.

Several reviewers praised Frank Langella's portrayal of Skeletor, including Rose DeWolf in the Philadelphia Daily News  (though saying his costume looked like a Halloween mask) and Roger Hulburt of the South Florida Sun Sentinel.

In a retrospective review, Glenn Heath Jr. of Slant Magazine called it a "jarring mix of corny screwball comedy and choppy action heroics." Chris Eggertsen of HitFix, in an article identifying the film's campy, positive qualities, called it "an objectively bad film with a big heart." Joshua Winning of Digital Spy wrote, "…beloved of '80s kids but scorned by critics, it's a high camp oddity that we should celebrate on its own terms."

Despite the film being panned, actor Frank Langella expressed to press that he loved playing Skeletor, and worked very hard to make the role as exciting as possible, remarking that it was a positive experience.

Legacy
The commercial failure of Masters of the Universe, among other films such as Superman IV: The Quest for Peace and Lifeforce, contributed to the eventual closure of Cannon Films. Cannon Films had intended to create a Masters of the Universe sequel, indicated by the end credits with a revelation that Skeletor survives his fall. The sequel, titled Masters of the Universe 2: Cyborg, was written; the script followed He-Man, who returned to Earth to battle Skeletor, who had left Earth as a postapocalyptic wasteland; and the film was to feature Trap Jaw and She-Ra. Pro surfer Laird Hamilton was originally to replace Dolph Lundgren as He-Man and the only aspect known about the sequel's screenplay was that He-Man would have returned to Earth disguised as a professional quarterback. With a low budget of $4.5 million, the sequel was to be directed by Albert Pyun, consecutively with the aborted Spider-Man movie. The project was abandoned when Cannon would not pay Mattel's fees. The already-made costumes and sets were instead utilized for the low-budget sci-fi film Cyborg.

Masters of the Universe was Lundgren's first leading role in a feature film following his success in Rocky IV, and he later labeled it as his least favorite film role. Conversely, Langella considers Skeletor one of his favorite roles.

Skeletor's question to He-Man ("Tell me about the loneliness of good, He-Man. Is it equal to the loneliness of evil?") is slightly reworded in the crossover comic miniseries, Injustice vs. Masters of the Universe.

References

Sources

External links

 
 
 

1987 films
1980s fantasy adventure films
1980s science fiction films
1980s superhero films
American fantasy adventure films
American science fantasy films
American superhero films
American sword and sorcery films
1980s English-language films
Films about orphans
Films about time travel
Films about witchcraft
Films adapted into comics
Films based on Mattel toys
Films based on television series
Films directed by Gary Goddard
Films scored by Bill Conti
Films set in 1986
Films set in 1987
Films set in New Jersey
Films set on fictional planets
Films shot in California
Films shot in Los Angeles
Films set in castles
Golan-Globus films
Live-action films based on animated series
Masters of the Universe
1987 directorial debut films
Sword and planet films
Films produced by Menahem Golan
Films produced by Yoram Globus
Films with screenplays by David Odell
Alien visitations in films
1980s American films